Salvador González Marco (born 9 October 1963), known as Voro, is a Spanish retired footballer who played as a central defender.

During his career he played mostly for Valencia and Deportivo (a total of 11 La Liga seasons, 318 matches), also coaching the former club on several occasions.

Voro represented Spain at the 1994 World Cup.

Playing career

Club
Born in Valencia, Voro graduated from hometown Valencia CF's youth academy, going on to represent their reserves in his first two years as a senior. After a one-and-a-half-year loan with CD Tenerife in the Segunda División, he played eight seasons – seven in La Liga – with the Ches first team, which included 37 games with two goals in 1989–90 as they finished second.

Subsequently, Voro joined Deportivo de La Coruña, being an instrumental part in the rise of Super Depor during the early to mid-1990s. Having started the 1996–97 campaign with the Galicians he finished it with CD Logroñés, retiring in the second tier in 1999.

International
Voro earned nine caps for the Spain national team in two years, and was part of the squad in the 1994 FIFA World Cup. His debut came on 13 October 1993, in a decisive 1994 World Cup qualifier against the Republic of Ireland in Lansdowne Road, Dublin (90 minutes played, 3–1 win).

Managerial career
On 21 April 2008, after several years working with Valencia as match delegate, Voro became manager of his former club following the sacking of Ronald Koeman. After saving the team from relegation with four wins in five matches, he was replaced by Unai Emery for 2008–09 and reinstated in his previous post.

Voro was appointed interim manager of Valencia on 30 November 2015 following the departure of Nuno Espírito Santo, before the position was filled by Gary Neville two days later. He led the side to a 1–1 draw against FC Barcelona at the Mestalla Stadium, in his only game in charge.

On 20 September 2016, Voro took the interim post for a fourth time after the dismissal of Pako Ayestarán. The same befell him on the penultimate day of the year, following Cesare Prandelli's resignation.

Voro was confirmed as manager 10 January 2017, until the end of the season. He returned for a sixth interim spell on 29 June 2020, when Albert Celades was fired with six matches to go. Only 11 months later, he was back in charge following the dismissal of Javi Gracia.

On 30 January 2023, Voro replaced Gennaro Gattuso as Valencia stood 14th in the table, again on an interim basis. After three losses in as many matches, he was replaced by former club player Rubén Baraja.

Managerial statistics

HonoursDeportivoCopa del Rey: 1994–95
Supercopa de España: 1995Valencia'
Segunda División: 1986–87

References

External links

CiberChe biography and stats 

1963 births
Living people
Spanish footballers
Footballers from Valencia (city)
Association football defenders
La Liga players
Segunda División players
Tercera División players
Valencia CF Mestalla footballers
Valencia CF players
CD Tenerife players
Deportivo de La Coruña players
CD Logroñés footballers
Spain international footballers
1994 FIFA World Cup players
Spanish football managers
La Liga managers
Segunda División B managers
Valencia CF Mestalla managers
Valencia CF managers
Valencia CF non-playing staff